Marjit Singh was a Meitei king who ruled Manipur kingdom between 1812 and 1819 as a vassal of Burma, but was eventually expelled by the Burmese. The Burmese devastated Manipur during a seven-year occupation that came to be known as Chahi-Taret Khuntakpa.

Family 
Marjit Singh was a son of Raja Ching-Thang Khomba, the ruler up to 1798. Afterwards, his numerous sons fought for the throne.

Madhuchandra succeeded his father first. He fled to Cachar when the Burmese threatened the kingdom. He tried to regain it with the help of the Cachar king Govinda Chandra. However, he was killed by the troops of his brother, Chourjit Singh. During Chourjit Singh's reign, Marjit Singh fled to Cachar and got into a serious dispute there. Then he went to Burma and received the help of King Bodawpaya and expelled Chourjit Singh.

Rule 
Marjit Singh ascended to the throne in 1812. Chourjit Singh, along with another brother Gambhir Singh, fled to Cachar. Govinda Chandra refused to help them against a brother, but Marjit Singh invaded Cachar anyway in 1817. Chourjit and Gambhir Singh helped Gonvda Chandra fend off Marjit Singh, but they in turn drove out Govinda Chandra, took over Cachar and plundered it.

At this stage, Marjit Singh appears to have gotten into trouble with the Burmese, who invaded the kingdom and expelled him.

Aftermath 
The Burmese occupation lasted until the First Anglo-Burmese War in 1824, and became locally known as Chahi-Taret Khuntakpa. It devastated Manipur. According Pemberto, Manipur was ‘doomed ... to the devastating visitation of Burmese armies which have nine or ten times swept the country from one extremity to the other, with the apparent determination of extirpating a race whom they found it impossible permanently to subdue.'

Marjit Singh went to Cachar and joined his brothers. They divided Cachar among themselves, with Marjit occupying Hailakandi and Gambhir Singh took control of South Cachar. Chourjit took shelter in Sylhet.

See also
List of Manipuri kings
Manipur (princely state)

References

Bibliography
 
 

Year of birth missing
Year of death missing
Meitei royalty
Hindu monarchs